80000 Shots is a German film directed by Manfred Walther. It was released in 2002 and had its premiere at the Berlin International Film Festival.

It is a documentary about the reconstruction of Berlin's Potsdamer Platz. The film runs for 55 minutes' and was shot in timelapse between 1990–2001.

References

External links
Official site

2002 films
German documentary films
2000s German-language films
2000s German films